Rap-A-Lot is a hip hop record label co-founded by James Prince and Cliff Blodget in 1986. Smoke-a-Lot Records is a subsidiary.

Rap-A-Lot was first distributed by A&M Records with the release of Raheem's 1988 debut The Vigilante. The label was distributed through the 1990s by EMI's Priority Records (1991–1994), Noo Trybe Records (1994-1998), and Virgin Records (1998–2002). In the 2000s, it was distributed by Asylum Records and then Fontana Distribution.

On August 22, 2013, Rap-A-Lot announced a distribution deal with RED Distribution.

History
The label was formed filling in a gap for recognition and promotion of southern talent especially in the Houston area. This was in part to label executives in other parts of the country passing on southern hip hop acts. During this period, DJ's from the east coast had been exploiting the region and pushing music from their domestic territories instead.

Notable artists

Rap A Lot 4 Life
Bun B
Pimp C (deceased)
Z-ro
Mike Dean
Juvenile
Geto Boys
Trae Tha Truth
Scarface
Do or Die
Devin The Dude
Yukmouth
Finesse2Tymes

Rap A Lot Boxing
Shakur Stevenson

YEMG (Jas Prince) 

Drake 
YK Osiris

New Wave (Baby Jay Prince)
Cordae
Almighty Jay
YBN Nahmir

Major releases

1980s
1987
Ghetto Boys - Car Freak
Ghetto Boys - You Ain't Nothing / I Run This

1988
Raheem - The Vigilante
Ghetto Boys - Making Trouble

1989
Geto Boys - Grip It! On That Other Level
Willie D - Controversy

1990s
1990
Choice - The Big Payback
Geto Boys - The Geto Boys

1991
O.G. Style - I Know How to Play 'Em
Big Mike & 3-2 - Convicts
Geto Boys - We Can't Be Stopped
Scarface - Mr. Scarface Is Back

1992
The Terrorists - Terror Strikes; Always Bizness, Never Personal
Too Much Trouble - Bringing Hell on Earth
Ganksta N-I-P -The South Park Psycho
Choice - Stick-N-Moove
Big Mello - Bone Hard Zaggin'
Raheem - The Invincible
Bushwick Bill - Little Big Man
Willie D - I'm Goin' Out Lika Soldier
Geto Boys - Uncut Dope: Geto Boys' Best
Seagram - The Dark Roads

1993
Geto Boys - Till Death Do Us Part
5th Ward Boyz - Ghetto Dope
Ganksta N-I-P - Psychic Thoughts
Too Much Trouble - Player's Choice
Scarface - The World Is Yours
DMG - Rigormortiz

1994
5th Ward Boyz - Gangsta Funk
Odd Squad - Fadanuf Fa Erybody!!
Trinity Garden Cartel - Don't Blame It on da Music
Blac Monks - Secrets of the Hidden Temple
Seagram - Reality Check
Big Mello - Wegonefunkwichamind
Big Mike - Somethin' Serious
Scarface - The Diary

1995
CJ Mac - True Game
5th Ward Juvenilez - Deadly Groundz
Bushwick Bill - Phantom of the Rapra
Poppa LQ - Your Entertainment, My Reality
Menace Clan - Da Hood
5th Ward Boyz - Rated G

1996
3-2 - The Wicked Buddah Baby
The Almighty RSO - Doomsday: Forever RSO
Geto Boys - The Resurrection
Do or Die - Picture This
Facemob - The Other Side of the Law
Ganksta N-I-P - Psychotic Genius
Various artists - 10th Anniversary

1997
Scarface - The Untouchable
Big Mike - Still Serious
Ghetto Twiinz - In That Water
Seagram - Souls on Ice
Too Much Trouble - Too Much Weight
5th Ward Boyz - Usual Suspects

1998
Scarface - My Homies
Devin the Dude - The Dude
Do or Die - Headz or Tailz
Geto Boys - Da Good Da Bad & Da Ugly
Ghetto Twiinz - No Pain No Gain
Blac Monks - No Mercy
Tela - Now or Never
Ganksta N-I-P - Interview with a Killa
Yukmouth - Thugged Out: The Albulation
Big Mike - Hard to Hit

1999
5th Ward Boyz - Keep It Poppin'
J Prince Presents R.N.D.S.

2000s
2000
Scarface - The Last of a Dying Breed
Do or Die - Victory
Tela - The World Ain't Enuff
Willie D - Loved by Few, Hated by Many

2001
Yukmouth - Thug Lord: The New Testament
Ghetto Twiinz - Got It on My Mind
Snypaz - Livin' in the Scope

2002
Devin the Dude - Just Tryin' ta Live
Outlawz - Neva Surrenda
Hussein Fatal - Fatal
Luniz - Silver & Black
Big Syke - Big Syke
Do or Die - Back 2 the Game
Tela - Double Dose
Scarface - Greatest Hits
Yukmouth - United Ghettos of America
Geto Boys - Greatest Hits
Facemob - Silence
Snypaz - Snypaz

2003
Scarface - Balls & My Word
Yukmouth - Godzilla
Slim Thug & Lil' Keke - The Big Unit
DMG - Black Roulette
Do or Die - Pimpin' Ain't Dead
Dirty - Love Us or Hate Us
Criminal Manne - Neighborhood Dope Manne
Do or Die - Greatest Hits

2004
Devin the Dude - To Tha X-Treme
Thug Lordz - In Thugz We Trust
Z-Ro - The Life of Joseph W. McVey
Various artists - The Day After Hell Broke Loose
UTP - The Beginning of the End
5th Ward Boyz - Greatest Hits
Yukmouth - United Ghettos of America Vol. 2
UTP - Nolia Clap

2005
Lil' Flip & Z-Ro - Kings of the South
Geto Boys - The Foundation
Z-Ro - Let the Truth Be Told
Pimp C - Sweet James Jones Stories
Bun B - Trill
Dirty - Hood Stories

2006
Belo Zero - The Truth 
Do or Die - Get That Paper
Z-Ro - I'm Still Livin'
Pimp C - Pimpalation
Scarface - My Homies Part 2
Trae - Restless
Partners-N-Crime - Club Bangaz

2007
Trae - Life Goes On
Devin the Dude - Waitin' to Inhale
Z-Ro - Power
Scarface - Made
Dirty - The Art of Storytelling
UTP - Back Like We Left Something

2008
Yukmouth - Million Dollar Mouthpiece
Scarface - The Best of Scarface
Devin the Dude - Greatest Hits
Yukmouth - Greatest Hits
Bun B - II Trill
Pimp C - Greatest Hits
Geto Boys - Best of the Geto Boys
ABN - It Is What It Is
Z-Ro - Crack
Devin the Dude - Hi Life
Trae - The Beginning
Scarface - Emeritus

2009
Z-Ro - Greatest Hits
Scarface - Greatest Features
Damm D - Never Forget Loyalty (N.F.L.)
Z-Ro - Cocaine

2010s
2010
Z-Ro - Heroin
Bun B - Trill O.G. 
Pimp C - The Naked Soul Of Sweet Jones

2011
Pimp C - Still Pimping
Z-Ro - Meth

2012
Z-Ro - Angel Dust
Juvenile - Rejuvenation

2013
Bun B - Trill OG: The Epilogue

2014
Juvenile - The Fundamentals

References

External links
 Rap-A-Lot Record's discography on discogs.com

American record labels
Record labels established in 1986
Hip hop record labels
Companies based in Houston
1986 establishments in Texas
Gangsta rap record labels
Virgin Records